Luis Adolfo Galván (born 24 February 1948 in Fernández, Santiago del Estero) is a retired Argentine footballer, who played in the centre back position.
He is perhaps most famous for having been part of the 1978 World Cup winning team.

International career

Galván played his first game of his 8-year international career for Argentina in 1975. He played for Argentina at the 1975 Pan American Games.
The indisputable highlight of his footballing career came in 1978 when he was selected to represent Argentina at the Argentina 78 tournament. He played all games in the tournament alongside captain Daniel Passarella which included the World Cup Final in the Monumental, where Argentina beat the Netherlands 3-1 after extra time, to win their first World Cup.

Galván was selected to play for Argentina at Spain 82, but the albicelestes had a disappointing campaign, eliminated in the 2nd group phase. He retired from international football one year later in 1983, at the age of 35. Galván made a total of 34 appearances for Argentina.

Club career

Galván started his career in 1970 at Talleres de Córdoba, the club where he spent the majority of his career. He never won a major trophy with the club but did help Talleres achieve second (1977) and fourth place (1976, 1978) in the Nacional Championship, and third place (1980) in the Metropolitano Championship. The Metropolitano and Nacional championships were Argentine football tournaments that existed between 1967 and 1984. The Metropolitano formed one half of the Argentine 1st division taking place in the first half of the year, while the Nacional took place in the 2nd half of the year.

Galván left the Talleres in 1982 after giving a 12-year service to the club, and went on to play for a string of provincial teams including Talleres' main rivals Belgrano de Córdoba.

In 1986 Galván moved to Bolivia to play for Bolívar in La Paz, but his stay there didn't last long, and he returned to play for Talleres in 1987.  He left professional football to play for  Sportivo Fernandez in his home province of Santiago del Estero in 1988, and finally for Talleres de Jesus Maria in 1989, where he retired from football at the age of 41.

Honours

Club
Talleres de Córdoba
 Copa Hermandad: 1977
 Liga Cordobesa de Fútbol: 1974, 1975, 1976, 1977, 1978, 1979

Loma Negra
 Liga de Fútbol de Olavarría: 1982

International
Argentina
 FIFA World Cup: 1978

References

External links

 
 Profile and Statistics at Futbolistasblogspotcom.blogspot.com

1948 births
Living people
Argentine footballers
FIFA World Cup-winning players
1978 FIFA World Cup players
1982 FIFA World Cup players
Talleres de Córdoba footballers
Club Atlético Belgrano footballers
Club Bolívar players
Expatriate footballers in Bolivia
People from Fernández, Santiago del Estero
Argentina international footballers
Association football defenders
Pan American Games bronze medalists for Argentina
Pan American Games medalists in football
Footballers at the 1975 Pan American Games
Medalists at the 1975 Pan American Games
Sportspeople from Santiago del Estero Province